Santa Marina Salina is a comune (municipality) and one of the main towns on Salina, one of the Aeolian Islands.

Santa Marina Salina borders the following municipalities: Leni, Malfa.

Notable people
 Al Costello (1919-2000) - Professional wrestler

References

Cities and towns in Sicily
Towns and villages in the Aeolian Islands